The 1989 Soul Train Music Awards was held at the Shrine Auditorium in Los Angeles, California and aired live in select cities on April 13, 1989 (and was later syndicated in other areas), honoring the best in R&B, soul, rap, jazz, and gospel music from the previous year. The show was hosted by Patti LaBelle, Ahmad Rashad and Dionne Warwick.

Special awards

Heritage Award for Career Achievement
 Michael Jackson

Sammy Davis Jr. Award for Entertainer of the Year
 Michael Jackson

Winners and nominees
Winners are in bold text.

Best R&B/Urban Contemporary Album of the Year – Male
 Bobby Brown – Don't Be Cruel
 Bobby McFerrin – Simple Pleasures
 Al B. Sure – In Effect Mode
 Luther Vandross – Any Love

Best R&B/Urban Contemporary Album of the Year – Female
 Anita Baker – Giving You the Best That I Got
 Tracy Chapman – Tracy Chapman
 Sade – Stronger Than Pride
 Vanessa Williams – The Right Stuff

Best R&B/Urban Contemporary Album of the Year – Group, Band, or Duo
 New Edition – Heart Break
 Guy – Guy
 LeVert – Just Coolin'
 Tony! Toni! Toné! – Who?

Best R&B/Urban Contemporary Single – Male
 Michael Jackson – "Man in the Mirror"
 Bobby Brown – "My Prerogative"
 Johnny Kemp – "Just Got Paid"
 Keith Sweat  – "Make It Last Forever"

Best R&B/Urban Contemporary Single – Female
 Anita Baker – "Giving You the Best That I Got"
 Whitney Houston – "Where Do Broken Hearts Go"
 Karyn White – "Superwoman"
 Vanessa Williams – "The Right Stuff"
Note-This segment of the awards ceremony is most memorable due to the fact that when Whitney Houston's name was called, the crowd began to boo her, citing the idea that Houston was "acting white" and was a "sell-out".

Best R&B/Urban Contemporary Single – Group Band or Duo
 E.U. – "Da Butt"
 Rob Base and DJ E-Z Rock – "It Takes Two"
 Guy – "Groove Me"
 New Edition – "Can You Stand the Rain"

Best R&B/Urban Contemporary Song of the Year
 Anita Baker – "Giving You the Best That I Got"
 Bobby Brown – "Don't Be Cruel"
 Michael Jackson – "Man in the Mirror"
 Keith Sweat – "I Want Her"

Best R&B/Urban Contemporary Music Video
 Michael Jackson – "Man in the Mirror"
 DJ Jazzy Jeff & the Fresh Prince – "Parents Just Don't Understand"
 Kool Moe Dee – "Wild Wild West"
 Stevie Wonder – "Skeletons"

Best R&B/Urban Contemporary New Artist
 Al B. Sure! 
 Guy
 Karyn White
 BeBe & CeCe Winans

Best Rap Album
 DJ Jazzy Jeff and the Fresh Prince – He's the DJ, I'm the Rapper
 Rob Base and DJ E-Z Rock – It Takes Two
 Public Enemy – It Takes a Nation of Millions to Hold Us Back
 Salt-N-Pepa – A Salt with a Deadly Pepa

Best Gospel Album
 Take 6 – Take 6
 Shirley Caesar – Live in Chicago
 The Clark Sisters – Conqueror
 James Cleveland – Inspired

Best Jazz Album
 Kenny G – Silhouette
 Bobby McFerrin – Simple Pleasures
 Najee – Day by Day
 Sade – Stronger Than Pride

Performances
 Ashford & Simpson
 Sheena Easton – "The Lover in Me"
 Levert and Heavy D & The Boyz – "Just Coolin'"
 Bobby Brown – "My Prerogative"
 Patti LaBelle – "I Just Can't Stop Loving You"
 Dionne Warwick
 New Edition and Rob Base – "Crucial"
 Shirley Caesar, The Clark Sisters, Thelma Houston, BeBe & CeCe Winans, Vickie Winans and The Winans – "Lean on Me"

References

Soul Train Music Awards
Soul
Soul
Soul Train
1989 in Los Angeles